Malenska Vas is a settlement south of Mirna Peč in southeastern Slovenia. The area is part of the historical region of Lower Carniola. The Municipality of Mirna Peč is now included in the Southeast Slovenia Statistical Region.

References

External links
Malenska Vas on Geopedia

Populated places in the Municipality of Mirna Peč